Christopher Michael Devenski (born November 13, 1990), also known as "Devo", is an American professional baseball pitcher in the Los Angeles Angels organization. He played in MLB for the Houston Astros from 2016 to 2020, and the Diamondbacks from 2021 to 2022. Prior to playing professionally, Devenski played college baseball for Golden West College and California State University, Fullerton. The Chicago White Sox selected Devenski in the 25th round, with the 771st overall selection, of the 2011 MLB draft. He was named an MLB All-Star in 2017.

Amateur career
Devenski attended Gahr High School in Cerritos, California. He played for the school's baseball team as both a pitcher and a shortstop. He graduated in 2008, and enrolled at Golden West College, where he played college baseball in his freshman year as a pitcher and shortstop. Devenski transferred to California State University, Fullerton, where he continued his college baseball career with the Cal State Fullerton Titans. The Titans' coaches convinced him to focus on pitching, and he accrued  innings pitched over 104 games in two seasons with the school. He also played collegiate summer baseball for the Woodstock River Bandits of the Valley Baseball League in 2011.

Professional career

Chicago White Sox
The Chicago White Sox selected Devenski in the 25th round, with the 771st overall selection, of the 2011 Major League Baseball draft. He made his professional debut with the Great Falls Voyagers of the Rookie-level Pioneer League. He started the 2012 season with the Kannapolis Intimidators of the Class A South Atlantic League.

Houston Astros
On August 3, 2012, Devenski was traded to the Houston Astros in August as the player to be named later in an earlier trade where the White Sox acquired Brett Myers. The Astros had already acquired Blair Walters and Matt Heidenreich in the trade. He had a 6–5 win–loss record and a 4.23 earned run average (ERA) in 19 games started for Kannapolis before the trade. The Astros assigned him to the Lexington Legends of the Class A Midwest League. On August 31, in his fifth start for Lexington, he threw a no-hitter with 16 strikeouts.

Devenski began the 2013 season with the Lancaster JetHawks of the Class A-Advanced California League. He struggled with Lancaster, working to a 7.88 ERA in  innings pitched, and was demoted to the Quad Cities River Bandits of the Class A Midwest League. Devenski started the 2014 season with Lancaster and received another midseason promotion, this time to the Corpus Christi Hooks of the Class AA Texas League. He pitched for Corpus Christi in 2015, finishing the season with a 3.01 ERA in  innings pitched. He was named their pitcher of the year. He was promoted to the Fresno Grizzlies of the Class AAA Pacific Coast League for the playoffs and pitched seven one-hit innings to help Fresno win the Triple-A National Championship Game. He was named the most valuable player of the championship game. Eligible in the Rule 5 draft after the 2015 season, the Astros did not protect Devenski on their 40-man roster, but Devenski was not selected.

The Astros assigned Devenski to Fresno for Opening Day of the 2016 season, but promoted him to the major leagues on April 6. He made his MLB debut on April 8. He finished the 2016 season with a 2.16 ERA and 0.914 walks plus hits per inning pitched ratio in 48 appearances.

Devenski continued to pitch for the Astros as a multi-inning relief pitcher in 2017. He was named to the American League's roster for the 2017 MLB All-Star Game on July 7. As of that day, he had a 2.09 ERA in  innings pitched, and led all major league relief pitchers in innings pitched, in strikeouts with 72, and tied for the most wins, with 6. He finished the regular season with an 8–5 win–loss record, a 2.68 ERA, and 100 strikeouts with 26 walks in  innings pitched. Devenski appeared in five games of the 2017 World Series, pitching a total of five innings while allowing four hits and four runs, although he was the winning pitcher of Game 2.

Devenski and the Astros agreed to a $1.525 million salary for the 2019 season.

On August 3, 2019, Devenski worked in relief in a combined no-hit shutout of the Seattle Mariners. The final score was 9–0. He struggled throughout the season, setting a career high 4.83 ERA in 61 games. On September 15, 2020, Devenski underwent arthroscopic surgery to remove a bone spur from his right elbow and missed the rest of the 2020 season. At the time of the surgery, he had allowed 6 earned runs across 3.2 frames.

Arizona Diamondbacks
On January 20, 2021, Devenski signed a minor league contract with the Arizona Diamondbacks organization. On March 29, 2021, Devenski was selected to the 40-man roster. On May 15, Devenski was placed on the 60-day injured list with a sprained right UCL. On June 6, Devenski underwent Tommy John surgery, officially ending his 2021 season. Devenski registered an 8.59 ERA in 8 games for Arizona in 2021. On October 8, Devenski elected free agency. On October 25, 2021, Devenski re-signed with the Diamondbacks on a minor league contract.

On August 26, 2022, Devenski was designated for assignment and became a free agent.

Philadelphia Phillies
On August 30, 2022, Devenski signed a minor league contract with the Philadelphia Phillies.

In 2022 between the two teams, in the major leagues he was 2–1 with an 8.59 ERA in 14.2 innings in which he gave up 21 hits in 18 relief appearances.

Los Angeles Angels
On November 28, 2022, Devenski signed a one-year minor league contract with the Los Angeles Angels.

Personal life
Devenski was raised in Santa Ana, California. His father, Mike, owns a moving company. Amanda, his twin sister, is a teacher. While he was attending college, his family moved to Artesia, California.

Devenski is often known to Astros fans by the nickname "Devo" after the new wave band of the 1980s.

See also

 List of Houston Astros no-hitters
 List of Major League Baseball no-hitters
 List of California State University, Fullerton people

References

External links

1990 births
Living people
American League All-Stars
Baseball players from Long Beach, California
Major League Baseball pitchers
Houston Astros players
Arizona Diamondbacks players
Philadelphia Phillies players
Cal State Fullerton Titans baseball players
Great Falls Voyagers players
Kannapolis Intimidators players
Lexington Legends players
Quad Cities River Bandits players
Lancaster JetHawks players
Corpus Christi Hooks players
Tiburones de La Guaira players
American expatriate baseball players in Venezuela
Golden West Rustlers baseball players